Cleistanthus sumatranus is an accepted name of a tree species in the genus Cleistanthus (family Phyllanthaceae). No subspecies are listed in the Catalogue of Life.

In Chinese, it is called 闭花木 bi hua mu and in Vietnamese Cách hoa (Sumatra).

Description 

Flowers are small, each with five sepals and five small petals (both male and female), with up to seven occurring in axillary fascicles, subtended by normal or smaller leaves, or on leafless spike-like axes. Flowering is typically from March–August; fruiting from April–October.

References

External links 

sumatranus
Flora of Indo-China
Trees of Vietnam
Flora of Malesia